Sobi FM (101.9 MHz) is a radio station based in the city of Ilorin, Kwara State, Nigeria. It was established on 10 July 2017 and is located on top of the Sobi Hill, off Shao Road, about 390 metres above sea level.

Founder 
The founder of Sobi FM, Lukman Akanbi Olayiwola Mustapha is a Nigerian politician and banker.

References

External links

Radio stations established in 2017
Radio stations in Nigeria
Privately held companies of Nigeria
2017 establishments in Nigeria